Jens Otto Andreas Gustafsson (born 15 October 1978) is a Swedish professional football manager and former player who played as a defender. He currently manages Polish side Pogoń Szczecin since 2022.

Managerial career 
On 28 May 2021, Gustafsson was named the new manager of Croatian Prva HNL side Hajduk Split. He signed a two-year contract, with the option of extending for a further one year. Gustafsson arrived at Hajduk after holding the position as manager for four and a half years at Allsvenskan club IFK Norrköping.

Gustafsson rejoined the Swedish national under-21 team at the beginning of 2022. On 9 May 2022, it was announced his contract had been bought out by Polish club Pogoń Szczecin, and he is due to replace Kosta Runjaić as team manager at the start of the 2022–23 season.

References

1978 births
Living people
Swedish footballers
Association football defenders
Superettan players
IK Brage players
Falkenbergs FF players
Högaborgs BK players
Swedish football managers
Halmstads BK managers
IFK Norrköping managers
HNK Hajduk Split managers
Pogoń Szczecin managers
Swedish expatriate football managers
Swedish expatriate sportspeople in Croatia
Swedish expatriate sportspeople in Poland
Expatriate football managers in Croatia
Expatriate football managers in Poland
Sportspeople from Helsingborg